The Far Eastern Plaza is a set of twin skyscrapers located in Daan District, Taipei, Taiwan. The buildings are each  in height 41 floors above the ground. The towers, designed by the Taiwanese architect Chu-Yuan Lee and the P&T Group, were completed in 1994 and were among the earliest skyscrapers in Taipei.

The south tower mainly contains offices whilst the north tower houses Shangri-La Far Eastern, Taipei.  It is managed by the Shangri-La Hotels and Resorts and has a total of 420 rooms. This is Shangri-La's second base in Taiwan, along with Shangri-La's Far Eastern International Hotel, Tainan. In recent years, it has won a medal from the Environmental Protection Administration for energy conservation and environmental protection. The Mall at Far Eastern Plaza opened in 1994 and currently houses the citysuper retail chain as well as Muji.

Gallery

See also 
 List of tallest buildings in Taiwan
 List of tallest buildings in Taipei
 Shangri-La Far Eastern, Taipei

References

1994 establishments in Taiwan
Office buildings completed in 1994
Skyscraper office buildings in Taipei
Skyscraper hotels in Taipei
Twin towers
Shopping malls in Taipei
Shopping malls established in 1994
Hotel buildings completed in 1994